The Shire of Kent is a local government area in the Great Southern region of Western Australia, about  southeast of Perth, the state capital. The area produces grains such as wheat, barley and legumes.

History

The Kent Road District was established on 22 December 1922. It was renamed the Nyabing-Pingrup Road District on 10 June 1955.

It was declared a shire as the Shire of Nyabing-Pingrup with effect from 1 July 1961 following the passage of the Local Government Act 1960, which reformed all remaining road districts into shires. It reverted to its previous name of Kent and became the Shire of Kent on 1 December 1972.

The name "Kent" comes from the commissariat officer of Dr T. Wilson’s expedition of 1829.

Wards
Following a redistribution in 2002, the Shire has been divided into four wards, each with two councillors:

 Holland Rock Ward
 Mindarabin Ward
 Nampup Ward
 Pingarnup Ward

Towns and localities
The towns and localities of the Shire of Kent with population and size figures based on the most recent Australian census:

Heritage-listed places

As of 2021, 73 places are heritage-listed in the Shire of Kent, of which none are on the State Register of Heritage Places.

References

External links
 

Kent